Adrian Bejan is an American professor who has made contributions to modern thermodynamics and developed his constructal law. He is J. A. Jones Distinguished Professor of Mechanical Engineering at Duke University and author of the books Design in Nature, The Physics of Life , Freedom and Evolution  and Time And Beauty: Why Time Flies And Beauty Never Dies

Early life and education

Bejan was born in Galaţi, a city on the Danube in Romania.
His mother, Marioara Bejan (1914–1998), was a pharmacist. His father, Dr. Anghel Bejan (1910–1976), was a veterinarian. Bejan showed an early talent in drawing, and his parents enrolled him in art school. He also excelled in basketball, which earned him a position on the Romanian national basketball team.

At age 19 Bejan won a scholarship to the United States and entered Massachusetts Institute of Technology in Cambridge, Massachusetts. In 1972 he was awarded BS and MS degrees as a member of the Honors Course in Mechanical Engineering. He graduated in 1975 with a PhD from MIT with a thesis titled "Improved thermal design of the cryogenic cooling system for a superconducting synchronous generator". His advisor was Joseph L. Smith Jr.

Career
From 1976 to 1978 Bejan was a Miller research fellow in at the University of California Berkeley working with Chang-Lin Tien. In 1978 he moved to Colorado and joined the faculty of the Department of Mechanical Engineering at the University of Colorado in Boulder. In 1982 Bejan published his first book, Entropy Generation Through Heat and Fluid Flow. The book is aimed at practical applications of the second law of thermodynamics, and presented his ideas on irreversibility, availability and exergy analysis in a form for engineers. In 1984 he published Convection Heat Transfer. In an era when researchers did heat transfer calculations using numerical methods on supercomputers, the book emphasized new research methods such as intersection of asymptotes, heatlines, and scale analysis to solve problems.

Bejan was appointed full professor at Duke University in 1984. In 1988 he published the first edition of his textbook Advanced Engineering Thermodynamics. The book combined thermodynamics theory with engineering heat transfer and fluid mechanics, and introduced entropy generation minimization as a method of optimization. In 1996 the ASME awarded him the Worcester Reed Warner Medal for "originality, challenges to orthodoxy, and impact on thermodynamics and heat transfer, which were made through his first three books".

In 1989 Bejan was appointed the J. A. Jones Distinguished Professor of Mechanical Engineering. In 1988 and 1989, his peers named two dimensionless groups Bejan number (Be), in two different fields: for the pressure difference group, in heat transfer by forced convection, and for the dimensionless ratio of fluid friction irreversibility divided by heat transfer irreversibility, in thermodynamics. From 1992 to 1996 he published four more books, Convection in Porous Media, Heat Transfer, Thermal Design and Optimization and Entropy Generation Minimization.

Constructal law
In 1995 while reviewing entropy generation minimization for a symposium paper and writing another paper on the cooling of electronic components, Bejan formulated the constructal law'''. Where electronic components are too small for convective cooling, they must be designed for efficient conduction. The paper provides a method for efficiently designing conductive paths, from smaller paths leading to larger ones. The similarity of the solution to the branching structures seen in multiple inanimate and living things led to his statement of what he calls a new law of nature: "For a finite-size system to persist in time (to live), it must evolve in such a way that it provides easier access to the imposed (global) currents that flow through it." To emphasize the coming together of paths he called the theory constructal from the Latin "to construct", in contrast with approaches using fractal geometry, from the Latin "to break".

Bejan incorporated his constructal law into the second edition of his textbook, Advanced Engineering Thermodynamics (1997). Since then he has concentrated on constructal law and its applications. In 2004, he published Porous and Complex Flow Structures in Modern Technologies. The same year, he and Sylvie Lorente were awarded the Edward F. Obert Award by the ASME for their paper "Thermodynamic Formulation of the Constructal Law" In 2008 he published Design with Constructal Theory, a textbook for the course he developed with Lorente at Duke. In 2011 the American Society of Mechanical Engineers presented him with an honorary membership. He was cited for "an extraordinary record of creative work, including the unification of thermodynamics and heat transfer; the conceptual development of design as a science that unites all fields; legendary contributions to engineering education; and, since 1996, the discovery and continued development of the constructal law."

Bejan has also written books for the general audience. In 2012 he published Design in Nature: How the Constructal Law Governs Evolution in Biology, Technology, and Social Organization and 2016 The Physics of Life: The Evolution of Everything. He credits these books for his award of the Ralph Coats Roe Medal from the ASME in 2017. He was cited for "permanent contributions to the public appreciation of the pivotal role of engineering in an advanced society through outstanding accomplishments as an engineering scientist and educator, renowned communicator and prolific writer".

In November 2017 the Franklin Institute of Philadelphia announced that Bejan would be awarded the 2018 Benjamin Franklin Medal in Mechanical Engineering. He was cited for "his pioneering interdisciplinary contributions in thermodynamics and convection heat transfer that have improved the performance of engineering systems, and for constructal theory, which predicts natural design and its evolution in engineering, scientific, and social systems."

On 27 June 2019, in Berlin, the Humboldt Foundation awarded Prof. Bejan the Humboldt Research Award for lifetime achievement. He was cited for "his pioneering contributions to modern thermodynamics and "Constructal Law" – a law of physics that predicts natural design and its evolution in biology, geophysics, climate change, technology, social organization, evolutionary design and development, wealth and sustainability".

On 30 December 2019, in Ankara, the Turkish Academy of Sciences (TÜBA) awarded Prof. Bejan the TÜBA International Academy Prize in the category of Basic and Engineering Sciences "for his remarkable number of creative works such as combining thermodynamics and heat transfer in the field of thermodynamics, developing design as a science that brings together all fields, and putting forth "Constructal Theory".

On 20 February 2020, in Durham, the French government awarded Prof. Bejan the title of Knight of the French Order of Academic Palms.

On 18 July 2021, the International Association for Green Energy (IAGE) gave Prof. Bejan the IAGE Lifetime Achievement Award “For revolutionary contributions to thermal sciences through entropy generation minimization and the original development of a new law in physics, the constructal law, for predicting natural design and its evolution as climate, social ecosystems, and sustainability.”

Selected awards and honors
Bejan has received multiple awards and honorary degrees.

 Fellow of the American Society of Mechanical Engineers (ASME), elected October 1987
 Max Jakob Memorial Award (ASME and AIChE), 1999
 Ralph Coats Roe Award, American Society of Engineering Education (ASEE), 2000
 Honorary Member of the American Society of Mechanical Engineers, 2011 
 Member of the Academy of Europe, elected 2013
Member of the national academies of Mexico, Turkey, Romania and Moldova.
 Ralph Coats Roe Medal, ASME, 2017 
 Benjamin Franklin Medal, Franklin Institute, 2018
Humboldt Research Award, Humboldt Foundation, 2019.
Turkish Academy of Sciences Prize (2019)
Lifetime Achievement Award, IAGE (2021)
Kimberly-Clark Distinguished Lectureship Award (2023)

Selected publications
Articles
 
 
 
 
 
 Bejan, Adrian "Entropy Generation Minimization: The New Thermodynamics of Finite-Size Devices and Finite-Time Processes," Journal of Applied Physics, Vol. 79, 1 February 1996, pp. 1191–1218.
 
Bejan, Adrian (2000). Shape and Structure, from Engineering to Nature. Cambridge University Press.
 
 

Book chapter
 

Books
 
 , updated in 1995, 2004, and 2013: 
 , updated in 1997, 2006, and 2016: 
 , updated in 1999, 2006, 2017: 
 
 
 
  
 
 
 
Bejan, Adrian (2020). Freedom and Evolution: Hierarchy in Nature, Society and Science. New York: Springer. .
Bejan, Adrian (2022). Time And Beauty: Why Time Flies And Beauty Never Dies. World Scientific. .
Bejan, Adrian (2022). Heat Transfer: Evolution, Design and Performance.'' Wiley. .

References

External links
 Faculty web page
 

1948 births
Living people
MIT School of Engineering alumni
Duke University faculty
People from Galați
Romanian emigrants to the United States
Romanian engineers
Fluid dynamicists
Thermodynamicists
American mechanical engineers
Fellows of the American Society of Mechanical Engineers